Santa Bárbara del Zulia is a city of some 80,000 inhabitants in Zulia State in Venezuela.  It is located to the south-west of Maracaibo Lake, in the Sur del Lago region of the state.  Governor and presidential candidate Manuel Rosales was born in this city on December 12, 1952.

Santa Bárbara is connected by two bridges across the Escalante River with the city of San Carlos del Zulia, forming a twin city.

Climate

References
 Emilio Strauss, William Fuenmayor, José Romero.(2000). Atlas del Estado Zulia.

Cities in Zulia
Populated places established in 1704
1704 establishments in the Spanish Empire